Legislative Assembly elections were held in Uttar Pradesh from 10 February to 7 March 2022 in seven phases to elect all 403 members for the 18th Uttar Pradesh Legislative Assembly. The votes were counted and the results were declared on 10 March 2022.

Background 
The tenure of Uttar Pradesh Legislative Assembly was scheduled to end on 14 May 2022. The previous assembly elections were held February–March 2017. After the election, Bharatiya Janata Party formed the state government, with Yogi Adityanath becoming Chief Minister.

Panchayat Elections 

In the 2021 Uttar Pradesh Panchayat Elections, SP won 760 wards, followed by BJP with 720 wards. Bahujan Samaj Party won 381 and Indian National Congress won 76 wards. Independents and smaller parties won in 1,114 wards. AAP  won 64 and AIMIM won 22 wards in the panchayat elections.

Political developments

In January 2022, ten BJP state legislators including three ministers, left the party and joined Samajwadi Party. On 19 January, Mulayam Singh Yadav's daughter-in-law Aparna Bisht Yadav joined BJP. She was followed by Mulayam Singh's brother-in-law Pramod Gupta who joined BJP on 20 January. On 25 January, former Union Minister and Congress leader Ratanjit Pratap Narain Singh joined BJP.

Schedule
The election schedule was announced by the Election Commission of India on 8 January 2022.

Parties and alliances

During the month of September, the NDA confirmed an alliance between BJP, AD(S) and the NISHAD Party. During the month of August, the NDA held talks with parties like JD(U), Ham(S) and others, however the seat sharing talks fell apart later. In October, there were major restructuring efforts by the alliance with new faces and revamp of parties in an effort to battle anti-incumbency. In the first 2 weeks of December, the alliance launched it campaign for the election. On 13 Jan the national democratic alliance sealed their seat sharing pact with NISHAD Party getting 16 and Apna Dal getting 17 and BJP competing on remaining 370 seats. 6 NISHAD Party candidates would fight on BJP symbol.

RLD was the first to join the alliance. The NCP and RJD too joined the alliance later. Various other smaller parties too joined while SBSP broke away from its alliance to join SP alliance. During the first seat sharing talks, SP agreed to give RLD 36 seats. Initially, RLD demanded 60 seats while SP were willing to give up to 30, later both the parties finalised at 33 with RLD mostly competing in West UP. RLD gave 8 symbol of SP candidates. Aam Aadmi Party and Samajwadi Party began talks for alliance, however they couldn't agree on seat sharing. Pragatisheel Samajwadi Party (Lohiya) joined the alliance later. On 13 January 2022, the alliance announced its initial candidates for the first few phases of the election. SP and SBSP would have a friendly fight on 1 seat while SP and AD(K) would have a friendly fight on 2 seats.

Unlike in previous years, the Bahujan Samaj Party announced that it would compete in the election all by itself. BSP went into an alliance with ten small political parties, namely the India Janshakti Party, Pacchasi Parivartan Samaj Party, Vishwa Shanti Party, Sanyukt Janadesh Party, Adarsh Sangram Party, Akhand Vikas Bharat Party, Sarvajan Awaz Party, Jagruk Janata Party and Sarvajan Sewa Party for their extended support to BSP.

Similar to BSP, the only party competing from the United Progressive Alliance was the INC. On 19 October 2021, Uttar Pradesh Congress leader Priyanka Gandhi announced 40% of tickets to women in upcoming Uttar Pradesh assembly polls.

All India Majlis-e-Ittehadul Muslimeen, Jan Adhikar Party, Bharat Mukti Morcha, Janata Kranti Party and Bharatiya Vanchit Samaj Party have formed a front to contest all 403 seats.



Others 
During the month leading up to the elections major political parties which aren't part of any alliance announced their intentions to compete in the election. 
 AAP announced that it would compete on all 403 seats but later contested on 349 seats including Charthawal Assembly constituency where the AAP candidate joined SP on poll eve. AAP started an alliance discussion with SP but the talks for alliance did not succeed.
 Shiv Sena announced they would compete all 403 seat in the election which was later reduced to 36 seats. 
 AIMIM originally was part of alliance and was given a seat share of 100 seats, however when SBSP broke the alliance to join hands with SP, AIMIM confirmed they would fight the election alone in 95 seats.

Later parties like VSIP, LJP (Ram Vilas), Rashtriya Rashtrawadi Party, ABHM and ASPKR also confirmed their participation in the election

Candidates

Manifestos

NDA 
On 8 February, BJP released its manifesto titled "Lok Sankalp Patra", ahead of the 1st phase of the elections. Some of the promises in it being:

 Pradhan Mantri Kisan Samman Nidhi (PMKISAN) scheme for landless farmers
 Scooty for girl students and working women
 Free coaching to female students preparing for UPSC and PSC
 Laptops and other gadgets needed for online education for students
 Give at least 1 job to each household
 3 free LPG cylinders to consumers each year under Ujjwala Yojna

BSP
BSP announced that it will not release election manifesto.

UPA
INC released its manifesto in three tranches. The first tranche "Shakti Vidhan" was released on 19 December 2021 which centered on women welfare. The second tranche "Bharti Vidhan" was released on 21 January 2022 which centered on youth welfare. The final tranche "Unnati Vidhan" was released on 9 February 2022 which centered on overall development and general issues.

Some key promises made in the manifesto are: 
 All farmers' debts shall be waived.
 Paddy and wheat shall be procured at ₹2,500 per quintal and sugarcane shall be procured at ₹400 per quintal
 Electricity bills shall be reduced by half and pending arrears from the COVID-19 period shall be waived
 ₹25,000 shall be provided to families worst-affected by COVID-19
 The backlog of 20 lakh jobs in the public sector shall be filled, including 8 lakh jobs for women
 Every girl in 10th and 12th standard will be given a smartphone and every woman enrolled in a graduate programme will be given an electric scooty
 40% of Vidhan Sabha tickets will be given to women
The fees for all examination forms will be waived and travel by bus and trains would be made free
Fulfilment of all vacant seats in state healthcare hospitals
Encouragement to industries, tourism, small and medium scale industries
To boost startups in the state, a ‘Seed Startup Fund’ worth  would be set up, prioritising the entrepreneurs below 30 years of age
All the vacant posts for Sanskrit, Urdu teachers Anganwadi, Asha and so on will also be filled
 In the basic education sector, the shortage of one lakh head teachers will be met

SP+
Samajwadi Party released its manifesto on 8 February 2022.

The National President of Samajwadi Party Akhilesh Yadav released his party's 88-page manifesto for the elections. Under the motto "Satya Vachan, Atoot Vaada", the manifesto is laden with promises to farmers, women and the youth. Some key points from the party's manifesto are:

 Minimum support price (MSP) for all crops
 All farmers to be debt-free by 2025
 Free power for irrigation, interest-free loan and insurance as well as pension benefits to farmers
  compensation to kin of farmers who died during farm protests
 Efforts to provide 22 lakh jobs in IT sector
 Urban employment guarantee act along lines of MGNREGS to boost jobs
 33 per cent reservation for women of all communities (SCs/STs/General) in government jobs including police force
Microfinance bank to help micro, small and medium enterprises (MSME)
 300 units of free power to domestic consumers
 Free Wi-Fi zones in all villages and cities
 Further modernisation and upgradation of police and health infrastructure
 Dial 1890 Mazdoor Power Line- will be launched for migrant labourers
 Zero tolerance for organised crimes and hate crimes against women, minorities and Dalits

Campaigns
Samyukt Kisan Morcha (SKM), the umbrella body of farmers, campaigned against the ruling BJP by organising public meetings and rallies asking farmers to not vote for BJP. SKM had organised the 2020–2021 Indian farmers' protest against the controversial three farm acts which were passed by the BJP-led Union Government in the BJP controlled Parliament of India in September 2020. These laws were eventually withdrawn by the Union government.

On 31 January 2022, the farmer leaders observed "Vishwasghat Diwas" (treachery day) across India after the Union government failed to fulfil promises that were made to the farmers during the withdrawal of agitation against three farm laws. SKM leaders have warned that the farm laws may be re-introduced if BJP wins the elections.

According to the SKM leaders the promises that BJP made to the farmers in the 2022 manifesto were also made in the 2017 election manifesto, but they were not implemented. Neither the income of the farmer was doubled nor they got Minimum support Price (MSP) for their produce.

SKM leaders launched "Mission UP and Uttarakhand" and appealed to the voters to not vote for BJP calling them anti-farmer. The appeal did not make any recommendation to vote for any specific political party. SKM's appeal was supported by 57 farmer organisations. Since the campaign rallies were banned due to COVID-19 pandemic in India, leaflets with the appeal were handed to the villagers.

Policy positions

Farm Laws
BJP's Union Agriculture Minister Narendra Singh Tomar in December 2021, had said that BJP brought the 3 agriculture amendment laws (repealed in 2021). "But the government is not disappointed. We moved a step back and we will move forward again because farmers are India’s backbone."

The INC and AAP are against the farm laws and had supported the farmers' unions during their year-long protest against the farm laws.

Samajwadi Party chief Akhilesh Yadav has stated that after forming the government in Uttar Pradesh, SP will not allow the implementation of any anti-farmer laws in Uttar Pradesh. He warned the farmers against BJP, and said that BJP had withdrawn the controversial farm laws to get votes from the farmers. SP's alliance partner Rashtriya Lok Dal is also against the implementation of farm laws.

Election Issues
Citing a survey from all constituencies of UP, DNA news reported that unemployment was the biggest issue for 73% of the voters. Inflation and price rise was second with 65% voter support. Development was 54% and stray animal was an issue for 39% voters.

Stray Cow

Slaughter of cow is illegal in most places in the country.  The anti slaughter laws were not strictly enforced until 2014. Cows are considered holy in Hinduism, yet the farmers regularly took their old cows to slaughter houses until the years before 2014 when BJP's Narendra Modi government won the general election.

The deadly stray cow attacks on humans and crops in both the urban and rural areas is an issue for the residents. In 2017, after coming to power, Yogi Adityanath government had promised to build cattle shelters to better manage the stray cattle. Since BJP came to power in 2017, cow slaughter has been made illegal in 18 states in India including UP, this was done in accordance with the right wing Hindu agenda. Since then the trading of male cattle has reduced due to the fear of arrest, persecution, lynching by cow vigilantes. The farmers unable to sell them, abandon them to wander on the roads and feed on standing crops.

The Adityanath ministry in the state of Uttar Pradesh introduced a special alcohol tax to earn money and maintain thousands of cow sheds operated by the government. The BBC reported that the tax did not solve the problem of stray cow and the cow sheds were found to be over crowded.

BJP state government claims to have provided money to the village pradhans to set up cow shelters to keep the stray cattle. Deccan Herald reported that it could not find cattle shelters in the villages of Sitapur, Lakhimpur Kheri, Hardoi and Unnao districts. Places that had cow shelters, were already full with no capacity to keep more cattle.

BJP leaders refused to accept that the stray cattle was an issue, even though the farmers consider it an issue. Speaking at a rally in Kanpur in February, PM Narendra Modi acknowledged the problem in his rally and said the Yogi government is trying to solve the problem by setting up cattle shelters.

The Samajwadi Party promised compensation of 5 Lakh ₹ for farmers who were killed by bulls. SP promised to fix the root cause of the problem, removing the fear in trading of livestock without any trouble or harassment. Akhilesh Yadav said that the farmers were forced to guard their crops to prevent it from being grazen by stray animals. He said that his government will make arrangements to take care of the cattle.

The Congress Party promised compensation of ₹3,000 per acre for damaged crops. It also promised a Godhan Nyay Yojana along the lines of a similar scheme in Chhattisgarh including the purchase of cow dung (gobar) for ₹2 per kilogram to promote organic farming and vermi-composting by Self-Help Groups. It promised an amount of ₹500 per stray animal that is turned into a village Gaushala for a fixed period.

On 22 February, the local farmers released hundreds of cattle at the venue of the election rally in Barabanki located 40 km from the state capital Lucknow. The act was to highlight the menace of the stray cattle in the area. In a viral video of the incident, hundreds of unattended cattle were seen roaming in the open rally ground.

Roads
Lack of roads was a major poll issue for people in Amethi.

Petrol diesel price
Akhilesh Yadav, Rahul Gandhi, Priyanka Gandhi Vadra campaigned on the massive increase in the price of petrol and diesel under the BJP government. Akhilesh claimed that soon after the UP elections are over the government will increase the price even more.

Inflation
Akhilesh Yadav stated that public will not be hit with inflation if SP alliance wins the election.

Unemployment
Akhilesh Yadav stated that he will give jobs to people and end the problem of unemployment. He also promised early recruitment for the Police and Army.

COVID-19 
The government's handling of the COVID-19 pandemic in India was criticized by Priyanka Gandhi, Arvind Kejriwal and Akhilesh Yadav who stated that the people were not given the needed help. Akhilesh accused the BJP government of hiding the actual data and fudging the data of Covid related deaths.

Incidents

Voting Machine malfunction
In the first, third and fourth phase of election, Electronic Voter Machine (EVM) malfunction was reported at several places. Talking about the first phase of elections, the Additional Chief Election Officer said that the malfunctioning machines were replaced after reports of malfunctions.

At multiple polling booths, pressing the button for SP Party on the EVM caused the vote slip being printed for the BJP candidate, instead of the SP candidate. SP has asked ECI to look into the matter. In the third phase of the election, such cases were reported at Bhognipur Assembly constituency in Kanpur Rural and Kishni Assembly constituency in Mainpuri district. In the fourth phase of the election, such cases were reported at Sri Nagar Assembly constituency in Lakhimpur Kheri district

Unattended VVPAT slips 
On 4 March, in Basti, Uttar Pradesh, a large number of VVPAT slips were found unattended on ground near the strong room where the EVMs were kept prior to counting. The slips were found by children out for playing. After the news of discovery of slips spread, a large crowd gathered that included party members and candidates along with members of the administration. According to the district officials, those slips may have been from the mock drill before election but admitted they should not have been thrown out. The administration assured investigation into the incident and action on the people involved.

Voting Machine theft
On 8 March 2022, in Varanasi, a truck carrying multiple EVMs was caught by the members of the Samajwadi Party in Varansi. Samajwadi Party chief Akhilesh Yadav said that SP members had caught one truck while two other trucks fled. According to the guidelines of Election Commission (EC) the EVMs cannot be moved without the consent of the contesting candidates, yet the Varanasi District Magistrate (DM) was transporting them without informing the local candidates. Yadav alleged that the Electronic Voting machines caught were being stolen from a EVM counting centre in Varanasi. The incident had occurred two days before the scheduled counting of votes on 10 March. Videos of the incident were also circulated on social media.

The DM of Varanasi said that the EVMs in the incident were the ones used for training. Yadav said, "Now that the EVMs have been caught, the officials will make multiple excuses". He called the candidates and party supporters to be alert to prevent any attempt of rigging during the vote counting. The SP+ alliance complained about the incident to the Election commission (EC). The EC had assured action in the incident. Yadav addressed a press conference where he accused the Election Commission officials of EVM tampering and added that he had lost trust on the EC. He said "We need to be alert if EVMs are being transported this way. This is theft. We need to save our votes. We may go to court against it but before that, I want to appeal to people to save democracy."

Varanasi police commissioner had admitted to lapses in the incident. Samajwadi Party had shared the video of the admission calling it an admission that EC protocol had not been followed by the officials. The Election Commission ordered action against Varanasi Additional District Magistrate and suspended him from his post for violating the rules in transportation of EVMs. According to the District Magistrate the EVMs were planned to be moved in the morning of 9 January, but the suspended Additional District Magistrate had taken them out in the previous night without providing the necessary information to others.

Postal ballot in garbage truck
On 9 March, in Bareilly three boxes full of election voting material (blank postal ballot) were discovered in the garbage trucks of city municipality. The truck was in the warehouse where voting machines and ballot papers were kept. The incident video was viral in the social media. Police and district administration arrived to meet Samajwadi party members regarding the incident and assured to take actions on their complaint. The Election commission acted on the complaint and removed the involved election official along with the SDM from their post.

On the same day in Moradabad 2 boxes of ballot paper was found by SP members in the truck operated by municipality.

In Sonbhadra district a box full of ballot papers was found in a truck accompanied by SDM's vehicle. Both vehicles were stopped outside the ballot counting center when they were trying to enter. The SDM was accused by SP members of replacing the ballot papers. Election commission ordered the SDM to be removed from his post.

Vote rigging allegations 
Controversy related to the security of the electronic voting machines happened in 10 districts of UP. In Lucknow members of all parties except ruling BJP were present to guard the voting machines. In Jalaun a car that was frequently moving in and out of the strong room was checked by SP workers who found hardware tools in the car.

In Sultanpur a truck full of boxes of EVM was found near the strong room, storing voting equipments. The SP workers guarding the strong room refused to let the truck enter the premises. The district officials claimed the boxes were empty. After ruckus, the district authority ordered that no voting related equipments should be moved before 11 March (the counting of vote was scheduled on 10 March).

Akhilesh Yadav alleged that the Office of the UP Chief Minister was making attempts to influence the counting of votes.

Election officer had asked details of the incident in Bareilly and Varanasi from the district administration for Election Commission to take a final decision on the incidents. Election Commission suspended the Varanasi ADM, Bareilly SDM and Sonbhadra SDM from election related duties.

Poll predictions

Opinion polls

Exit polls 
The Election Commission banned the media from publishing exit polls between 7 AM on 10 February 2022 and 6:30 PM on 7 March 2022. With an imprisonment of two years for the violation of the directive. Accordingly these exit polls were published in the evening of 7 March 2022.

Voter turnout

Results

Results by alliance and party

Results by division

Results by district

Results by polling phase

Results by constituency

See also

 2022 elections in India
 18th Uttar Pradesh Assembly
 Elections in Uttar Pradesh

References

Notes

Citations

External links 
 Gen Election to Vidhan Sabha Trends & Result March-2022 at Election Commission of India – select State "Uttar Pradesh" and Constituency

2022 State Assembly elections in India
State Assembly elections in Uttar Pradesh
2022 Uttar Pradesh Legislative Assembly election